Susung High School (Korean: 수성고등학교, Hanja: 水城高等學校) is a high school located in Suwon, South Korea. As of April 2013, the school had 1,461 students enrolled. The school was established on 7 July 1954 and opened on 25 April 1955.

Notable alumni
Kwak Jae-yong, a film director
Kim Hak-min, a volleyball player
Oh Dae-gyu, an actor
Won Yoo-chul, a politician
Yeom Tae-young, the Mayor of Suwon
Park Jun-young, the Deputy Minister of Oceans and Fisheries

References

External links
 Susung High School

High schools in South Korea
Schools in Suwon
Boys' schools in South Korea